The Kashmir field mouse (Apodemus rusiges)  is a species of rodent in the family Muridae.
It is found in India, Nepal, and Pakistan.

References

Rats of Asia
Rodents of India
Mammals of Pakistan
Mammals of Nepal
Apodemus
Mammals described in 1913
Taxonomy articles created by Polbot